Holshe Khrie-o Dzüne is an Indian professional Sepak Takraw who also serves as the Nagaland State Sepak Takraw coach.

Biography
Holshe Khrie-o was born in Viswema, Nagaland. At the 17th Asian Games in 2014 in Korea, Khrie-o along with Viseyie Koso and Keneileno Nakhro represented the Indian Sepaktakraw team.

References

Living people
Sepak takraw players
Indian sportspeople
Year of birth missing (living people)
People from Viswema